This is a new event in the ITF Women's Circuit.

Irina Khromacheva won the title, defeating Cindy Burger 6–1, 6–2 in the final.

Seeds

Main draw

Finals

Top half

Bottom half

References 
 Main draw

Sport11 Ladies Open - Singles